Converge ICT Solutions Inc., commonly referred to as Converge (also known as ComClark in Pampanga), is a telecommunication service provider in the Philippines. It operates fiber optic broadband networks, Internet Protocol television (marketed as Converge Vision; in partnership with Pacific Kabelnet), cable television (marketed as Air Cable), and cable Internet (marketed as Air Internet) in the country. It had 1,845,162 FiberX subscribers as of September 2022 capturing 54% of the market share of fiber to the home in the country. As of 2022, the Converge fiber backbone reached 600,000 kilometers, passing through 495 cities and municipalities across the country.

History 
Converge was established in 1996 as the ComClark Network and Technology Corp. by Dennis Anthony Uy in 1996 at Angeles City.

In 2009, the Congress of the Philippines enacted Republic Act No. 9707, to grant Converge ICT Solutions Inc. the franchise to construct, install, establish, operate, and maintain a telecommunication system throughout the Philippines. 

In 2020, Converge ICT Solutions Inc. debuted in the Philippine Stock Exchange through an initial public offering.

In 2021, Uy told local media that a deal “is on” with Satellite Internet provider Starlink.

Demand for services surged during the pandemic, with an estimated 84% jump in revenue during the first quarter of the 2021 fiscal year. 

In 2021, the company also partnered with the Department of Trade and Industry (DTI) and local governments to provide free fiber-powered internet and tents at Diskwento Caravan.

In October 2021, Converge ICT completed the domestic subsea cable project, with ₱6 billion investment cost.

Service areas 
Converge ICT serves fiber optic Internet access in Metro Manila, Calabarzon, Central Luzon and several parts of the Bicol and Ilocos regions, and continues to expand its coverage across the country.

Converge ICT competes with PLDT and Globe Telecom as providers of fiber-to-the-home broadband Internet, in their respective areas of coverage. As of March 2022, it has around 1.8 million subscribers, all of whom are in Luzon, Visayas, and Mindanao.

See also 
 Converge FiberXers

References

External links 

Companies based in Pasig
Companies based in Pampanga
Telecommunications companies of the Philippines
Telecommunications companies established in 2009
Philippine companies established in 2009
Companies listed on the Philippine Stock Exchange